The Wordsworth Circle is a quarterly academic journal established in 1970 to publish contemporary studies of literature, culture, and society in Great Britain, Europe, and North America during the Romantic period from about 1760–1850. It covers work on the lives, works, and times of writers from that period, including publications and publishers. The journal  includes work on non-literary figures (historians, scientists, artists, architects, philosophers, theologians, and social commentators) and topics (science, politics, religion, aesthetics, education, legal reform, and music)—anything that appeared during, impinges upon, or is of interest to Romanticists. Essay-reviews of major books appear in the fourth issue of every volume.  Subscriptions include membership in The Wordsworth-Coleridge Association. Starting in 2019, the journal will be published by the University of Chicago Press.

External links

Boston University
Quarterly journals
Romanticism
Literary magazines published in the United States
Publications established in 1970
English-language journals